I Was a Convict is a 1939 American crime film directed by Aubrey Scotto and written by Robert Hardy Andrews and Ben Markson. The film stars Barton MacLane, Beverly Roberts, Clarence Kolb, Janet Beecher, Horace McMahon and Ben Welden. The film was released on March 6, 1939, by Republic Pictures.

Plot

Cast
Barton MacLane as Ace King
Beverly Roberts as Judy Harrison
Clarence Kolb as John B. Harrison
Janet Beecher as Mrs. Martha Harrison
Horace McMahon as Missouri Smith
Ben Welden as Rocks Henry
Leon Ames as Jackson
Clara Blandick as Aunt Sarah Scarlett
Russell Hicks as District Attorney
John Harmon as Matty
Chester Clute as Evans
Crauford Kent as Dr. Garson
Edwin Stanley as Dr. Craile
Harry Holman as Martin Harrison

References

External links
 

1939 films
American crime films
1939 crime films
Republic Pictures films
Films directed by Aubrey Scotto
American black-and-white films
1930s English-language films
1930s American films